The women's pole vault at the 2006 European Athletics Championships were held at the Ullevi on August 9 and August 12.
Isinbayeva tried three times to set the new world record (5.02) but failed..

Medalists

Schedule

Results

Qualification
Qualification: Qualifying Performance 4.40 (Q) or at least 12 best performers (q) advance to the final.

Final

External links
Results

Pole vault
Pole vault at the European Athletics Championships
2006 in women's athletics